Marsa may refer to:

Places
Marsa, Aude, a commune in the Aude départment of France
Marsa, Malta, a city in central Malta
Mârșa, a commune in Giurgiu County, Romania
La Marsa, a suburb of the city of Tunis, Tunisia
Mârșa, a village in Avrig town, Sibiu County, Romania

Other uses
MARSA (aviation), a set of procedures for aircraft separation
Marsa (football), a nickname for Croatian football club Marsonia
Marsa F.C., a Maltese football club
Mârșa River, a tributary of the Olt in Romania
AS Marsa (volleyball), a Tunisian volleyball league

See also
El Marsa (disambiguation)

Marsas (disambiguation)